State Highway 116 (SH 116) is a fairly isolated state highway in Colorado that runs from the Kansas state line in the southeastern corner of the state. SH 116's western terminus is at U.S. Route 287 (US 287) and US 385 near Springfield, and the eastern terminus is at W Road 12 at the Kansas state line.

Route description
The highway gives service though very rural country in Baca County through Two Buttes to the junction with US 287 and US 385 about 7 miles north of Springfield. The highway's maintenance is served by Two Buttes, the only town on its route. The town is the largest town for many miles in any direction.

Major intersections

See also

 List of state highways in Colorado

References

External links

116
Transportation in Baca County, Colorado